The 1990 Czechoslovak Open, also known as the Prague Open was a men's tennis tournament played on outdoor clay courts at the I. Czech Lawn Tennis Club in Prague, Czechoslovakia that was part of the ATP World Series (Designated Week) of the 1990 ATP Tour. It was the fourth edition of the tournament and was held from 6 August until 12 August 1990. Eighth-seeded Jordi Arrese won the singles title.

Finals

Singles
 Jordi Arrese defeated  Nicklas Kulti 7–6, 7–6
 It was Arrese's 2st singles title of the year and of his career.

Doubles
 Vojtěch Flégl /  Daniel Vacek defeated  George Cosac /  Florin Segărceanu 5–7, 6–4, 6–3

References

External links
 ITF tournament edition details

Czechoslovak Open
Prague Open (1987–1999)
Czechoslovak Open